Luis Mariano Eusebio González García (13 August 1914 – 14 July 1970), also known as Luis Mariano, was a popular tenor of Spanish origin who achieved celebrity in 1946 with "La belle de Cadix" ("The Beautiful Lady of Cadix") an operetta by Francis Lopez. He appeared in the 1954 film Adventures of the Barber of Seville and Le Chanteur de Mexico (1957) and became popular in France as well as his native Spain.

Biography

Luis Mariano was born in Irun, Spain on 13 August 1914, the son of a garagiste and taxi-driver and showed interest in singing as a child. His family moved to France at the start of the Spanish Civil War and settled in Bordeaux where he studied at the Conservatoire, and also sang in cabarets.

Jeanne Lagiscarde, who was in charge of the classical department of a record store in Bordeaux, took Mariano under her wing, and gave up her job to nurture his talent in Paris. To earn a living, he sang in stage shows and appeared in films, starting with 'L'escalier sans fin' in 1943. That year he auditioned for the role of Ernesto in Don Pasquale, and sang in the opera at the Palais de Chaillot and later at the Théâtre des Variétés, with Vina Bovy, recording excerpts from the opera. He also left many recordings of popular song and operetta.

He continued to appear in other films from 1946, including a singing role in Napoléon and a film adaptation of Lehar's Der Zarewitsch.

In his encyclopedia Gänzl describes Mariano as a "svelte singing idol of French operetta of the post-war stage and screen". Mariano died in Paris in 1970.

His music is featured prominently in the 1996 Belgian film Le huitième jour in which he is played by Laszlo Harmati during scenes employing magical realism.

In 2014, French baritone David Serero recorded an album with Mariano classics performed in a Jazz version for the 100th anniversary of his birth: David Serero chante Luis Mariano – jazz version.

Filmography

References

External links 

 Official web site 
 

1914 births
1970 deaths
Basque musicians
French people of Spanish descent
Exiles of the Spanish Civil War in France
People from Irun
Pathé-Marconi artists
Conservatoire de Bordeaux alumni
20th-century French male singers